QCT is a provider of data center hardware and cloud solutions that are used by hyperscale data center operators. 

QCT sells approximately one out of every seven servers manufactured in the world.

In addition to its headquarters in Taoyuan, Taiwan, QCT has offices in San Jose, Seattle, Beijing, Hangzhou and Tokyo.

History 
QCT was established in May 2012 to manufacture servers for end users. In the course of 2012 QCT also added storage hardware and networking switches to its portfolio and became a hardware provider in the cloud market. In 2013 QCT added rack systems to its product portfolio. In 2015 QCT partnered with software vendors  to offer software-defined, hyper-converged infrastructure solutions for a variety of cloud environments: public, private and hybrid. Mike Yang serves as general manager of QCT.

Research 
In 2004 
In 2012 QCT became an early contributor to the Open Compute Project (OCP). As an OCP solution provider, QCT designs, builds and delivers OCP servers for data centers.

Notes

References

External links

Data centers
Cloud computing providers
Companies based in Taoyuan City
Taiwanese companies established in 2012
Quanta Computer